The Ancient Greek noun  is a common term for an artisan/craftsman, in particular a carpenter, woodworker, or builder. The term is frequently contrasted with an ironworker, or smith and stone-worker or mason.

Etymology
 is derived from the Proto-Indo-European root , which means "to carve, to chisel, to mold." It is comparable to the Sanskrit , literally "wood-cutter".

Septuagint

The characteristic Ancient Greek distinction between the general worker or wood-worker and the stonemason and the metal-worker occurs frequently in the Septuagint:

The distinction occurs in lists of workmen working on building or repairs to the temple in Jerusalem, for example in the repairs carried out under the priest Jehoiada and "the carpenters and builders, that wrought upon the house of the ,... And to masons, and hewers of stone, and to buy timber and hewed stone to repair the breaches of the house of the ", in 2 Kings 12:11–12. This same incident is recounted in similar language, using  again, in the account of Josephus.

However, in the Septuagint, tektōn is especially broad and vague; a modifier is often necessary to disambiguate the term. This is likely due to the influence of the broad Hebrew term חָרָשׁ on the Greek translation (LXX). Thus, tektōn in the Septuagint can only be specifically defined (i.e. woodworker, blacksmith, etc.) via an accompanying modifier or contextual clues.

New Testament

Gospel references

This is translated as "carpenter" in English-language Bibles.

The term occurs in combination with the definite article in Mark 6:3 to describe the occupation of Jesus.

The term is also used in the Gospel of Matthew in relation to Jesus' adoptive father Joseph.

In modern scholarship, the word has sometimes been re-interpreted from the traditional meaning of carpenter and has sometimes been translated as craftsman, as the meaning of builder is implied, but can be applied to both wood-work and stone masonry. In his 2021 article in Neotestamentica, Matthew K. Robinson argues that, due to its vagueness (particularly from influence from the LXX), tektōn in Mark 6:3 should be translated according to contextual clues. Referencing ancient literature and recent archeological evidence, Robinson argues that the best translation for tektōn in Mark 6:3 is "builder-craftsman."

Hebrew  interpretation
(as Isaiah 44:13). The term  occurs 33 times in the Masoretic Text of the Hebrew Bible.

This theory was later popularized by A. N. Wilson to suggest that Jesus had some sort of elevated status.

The original text with "There is no carpenter or son of carpenter that can take it apart" is found in Avodah Zarah 50b in discussion of whether to prune a tree on the Sabbath, with "carpenter" used in Isidore Epstein (Soncino) and Michael Rodkinson's translations and Ezra Zion Melamed's Lexicon. In the modern English version of the Talmud Jacob Neusner the passage reads as follows:

However, the Greek term  does not carry this meaning, and the nearest equivalent in the New Testament is Paul's comparison to Timothy of a "workman" rightly "dividing" the word of truth. This has been taken as carpentry imagery by some Christian commentators. The suggested term  ("craftsman") is not found in biblical Aramaic or Hebrew, or in Aramaic documents of the New Testament period, but is found in later Talmudic texts where the term "craftsman" is used as a metaphor for a skilled handler of the word of God.

References

Further reading

New Testament Greek words and phrases
Construction trades workers
History of construction